

Astray is an album by the American punk rock band Samiam. It was released in 2000 on Hopeless Records and Burning Heart Records.

Production
The album was produced by Tim O'Heir.

Critical reception
CMJ New Music Monthly wrote that "Samiam makes a smarter, deeper and all the while catchier kind of rawk, filled with dirty guitars and pummeling drums." NME called the album "pop-speckled bittersweet hardcore executed with studied panache."

Track listing

Personnel
Sean Kennerly - bass
James Brogan - guitar
Johnny Cruz - drums
Jason Beebout - vocals
Sergie Loobkoff - guitar

Music video
The music video for "Mud Hill" (Track 4) was shot in the Van Nuys district.

References

2000 albums
Samiam albums
Hopeless Records albums
Burning Heart Records albums